The following lists events that happened during 1925 in Chile.

Incumbents
President of Chile: Luis Altamirano (until 23 January), Pedro Dartnell (until 27 January), Emilio Bello (until 20 March), Arturo Alessandri (until 1 October), Luis Barros Borgoño (until 23 December), Emiliano Figueroa

Events

January
23 January – The 1925 Chilean coup d'état overthrows the September Junta.
27 January – The January Junta is established and recalls Arturo Alessandri to the presidency.

March
March – Marusia massacre

August
30 August – The Chilean constitutional referendum, 1925 is held. It creates the Chilean Constitution of 1925.

October
1 October – President Arturo Alessandri resigns. 
22 October – Emiliano Figueroa is elected as president in the Chilean presidential election, 1925.

November
22 November – The Chilean parliamentary election, 1925 is held. The Liberal Party becomes the largest party in the Chamber of Deputies.

Births 
15 January – Luis Mayanés (d. 1979)
19 March – Julio Canessa (d. 2015)
26 March – Claudio Spies (d. 2020)
9 August – Valentín Pimstein (d. 2017)
25 December - Carla Cordua

Deaths 
2 November – Sofanor Parra (b. 1850)

References 

 
Years of the 20th century in Chile
Chile